The common English names are those used by Tarboton (2015) and Tarboton and Tarboton (2015). Alternative names used by Tarboton and Tarboton (2002), Tarboton and Tarboton (2005), Samways (2008), and Dijkstra and Clausnitzer (2014) are given in brackets.

Zygoptera (damselflies)

Calopterygidae
 Phaon
 Phaon iridipennis, glistening demoiselle

Chlorocyphidae
 Chlorocypha
 Chlorocypha consueta, ruby jewel
 Platycypha
 Platycypha caligata, dancing jewel
 Platycypha fitzsimonsi, boulder jewel (Fitzsimons's jewel)

Synlestidae
 Chlorolestes
 Chlorolestes apricans, Amatola malachite (basking malachite)
 Chlorolestes conspicuus, conspicuous malachite
 Chlorolestes draconicus, Drakensberg malachite
 Chlorolestes elegans, elegant malachite
 Chlorolestes fasciatus, mountain malachite
 Chlorolestes nylephtha, queen malachite
 Chlorolestes peringueyi, rock malachite (marbled malachite)
 Chlorolestes tessellatus, forest malachite
 Chlorolestes umbratus, white malachite

Lestidae
 Lestes
 Lestes dissimulans, cryptic spreadwing
 Lestes ictericus, tawny spreadwing
 Lestes pallidus, pallid spreadwing
 Lestes plagiatus, highland spreadwing (common spreadwing)
 Lestes tridens, spotted spreadwing
 Lestes uncifer, sickle spreadwing
 Lestes virgatus, smoky spreadwing

Platycnemididae

 Allocnemis
 Allocnemis leucosticta, goldtail
 Elattoneura
 Elattoneura frenulata, sooty threadtail
 Elattoneura glauca, common threadtail
 Mesocnemis
 Mesocnemis singularis, savanna riverjack (riverjack, common riverjack)
 Metacnemis
 Metacnemis valida, blue riverjack (Kubusi stream-damsel, Kubusi streamjack)
 Spesbona
 Spesbona angusta, spesbona (Ceres stream-damsel, Ceres streamjack)

Coenagrionidae
 Aciagrion
 Aciagrion dondoense, opal slim
 Aciagrion gracile, graceful slim (Aciagrion pinheyi is treated as conspecific with A. gracile)

 Africallagma
 Africallagma fractum, slender bluet
 Africallagma glaucum, swamp bluet
 Africallagma sapphirinum, sapphire bluet
 Africallagma sinuatum, arid bluet
 Agriocnemis
 Agriocnemis exilis, little whisp
 Agriocnemis falcifera, white-masked whisp
 Agriocnemis gratiosa, gracious whisp
 Agriocnemis pinheyi, Pinhey's whisp
 Agriocnemis ruberrima, orange whisp
 Azuragrion
 Azuragrion nigridorsum, sailing bluet (black-tailed bluet)
 Ceriagrion
 Ceriagrion glabrum, common citril
 Ceriagrion suave, suave citril
 Ischnura
 Ischnura senegalensis, tropical bluetail (African bluetail)
 Proischnura
 Proischnura polychromatica, Cape bluet
 Proischnura rotundipennis, round-winged bluet
 Proischnura subfurcata, fork-tailed bluet
 Pseudagrion
 Pseudagrion acaciae, acacia sprite
 Pseudagrion assegaii, assegai sprite
 Pseudagrion caffrum, springwater sprite
 Pseudagrion citricola, yellow-faced sprite
 Pseudagrion coeleste, catshead sprite
 Pseudagrion commoniae, black sprite
 Pseudagrion draconis, mountain sprite
 Pseudagrion furcigerum, palmiet sprite
 Pseudagrion gamblesi, great sprite (Gamble's sprite)
 Pseudagrion hageni, painted sprite (Hagen's sprite)
 Pseudagrion hamoni, swarthy sprite (Hamon's sprite)
 Pseudagrion inopinatum, Balinsky's sprite (Badplaas sprite)
 Pseudagrion kersteni, powder-faced sprite (Kersten's sprite)
 Pseudagrion makabusiense, makabusi sprite
 Pseudagrion massaicum, Masai sprite
 Pseudagrion newtoni, harlequin sprite (Newton's sprite)
 Pseudagrion salisburyense, slate sprite (Salisbury sprite)
 Pseudagrion sjoestedti, variable sprite (Sjostedt's sprite)
 Pseudagrion spernatum, upland sprite (Natal sprite)
 Pseudagrion sublacteum, cherry-eye sprite
 Pseudagrion sudanicum, blue-sided sprite (Sudan sprite)
 Pseudagrion vaalense, Vaal sprite

Anisoptera (dragonflies)

Gomphidae

 Ceratogomphus
 Ceratogomphus pictus, common thorntail
 Ceratogomphus triceraticus, Cape thorntail
 Crenigomphus
 Crenigomphus cornutus, horned talontail
 Crenigomphus hartmanni, clubbed talontail (Hartmann's talontail)
 Gomphidia
 Gomphidia quarrei, southern fingertail (Quarre's fingertail)
 Ictinogomphus
 Ictinogomphus ferox, common tigertail
 Lestinogomphus
 Lestinogomphus angustus, spined fairytail
 Microgomphus
Microgomphus nyassicus, eastern scissortail
 Neurogomphus
 Neurogomphus zambeziensis, Zambezi siphontail
 Notogomphus
 Notogomphus praetorius, yellowjack (yellowjack longleg)
 Onychogomphus
 Onychogomphus supinus, lined claspertail (claspertail, gorge claspertail)
 Paragomphus
 Paragomphus cognatus, rock hooktail (boulder hooktail)
 Paragomphus elpidius, corkscrew hooktail
 Paragomphus genei, common hooktail (green hooktail)
 Paragomphus magnus, great hooktail
 Paragomphus sabicus, flapper hooktail (Sabi hooktail)
 Phyllogomphus
 Phyllogomphus brunneus, bold leaftail

Aeshnidae
 Anaciaeschna
 Anaciaeschna triangulifera, evening hawker
 Anax
 Anax ephippiger, vagrant emperor
 Anax imperator, blue emperor
 Anax speratus, orange emperor
 Anax tristis, black emperor
 Gynacantha
 Gynacantha manderica, little duskhawker (little dusk-hawker)
 Gynacantha usambaricus, Usambara duskhawker (Usambara dusk-hawker)
 Gynacantha villosa, hairy duskhawker (hairy cusk-hawker, brown duskhawker)
 Pinheyschna
 Pinheyschna subpupillata, stream hawker
 Zosteraeschna
 Zosteraeschna minuscula, friendly hawker
 Zosteraeschna usambarica, forest hawker (Elliot's hawker)

Synthemistidae

 Syncordulia
 Syncordulia gracilis, yellow presba
 Syncordulia legator, gilded presba
 Syncordulia serendipator, rustic presba
 Syncordulia venator, chestnut presba (mahogany presba)

Macromiidae
 Phyllomacromia
 Phyllomacromia contumax, two-banded cruiser
 Phyllomacromia monoceros, sable cruiser (black cruiser, unicorn cruiser)
 Phyllomacromia picta, darting cruiser

Corduliidae
 Hemicordulia
 Hemicordulia africana, African emerald

Libellulidae

 Acisoma
 Acisoma inflatum, stout pintail (grizzled pintail)
 Acisoma variegatum, slender pintail (grizzled pintail)
 Aethriamanta
 Aethriamanta rezia, pygmy basker
 Brachythemis
 Brachythemis lacustris, red groundling
 Brachythemis leucosticta, banded groundling
 Bradinopyga
 Bradinopyga cornuta, horned rockdweller (don-dwala)
 Chalcostephia
 Chalcostephia flavifrons, inspector
 Crocothemis
 Crocothemis divisa, rock scarlet (divisa scarlet)
 Crocothemis erythraea, broad scarlet
 Crocothemis sanguinolenta, little scarlet

 Diplacodes
 Diplacodes lefebvrii, black percher
 Diplacodes luminans, barbet percher (barbet)
 Diplacodes pumila, dwarf percher
 Hemistigma
 Hemistigma albipuncta, African piedspot (pied-spot)
 Macrodiplax
 Macrodiplax cora, coastal pennant (Cora's pennant)
 Nesciothemis
 Nesciothemis farinosa, eastern blacktail (black-tailed skimmer)

 Notiothemis
 Notiothemis jonesi, eastern forestwatcher (forest-watcher, Jones' forestwatcher)
 Olpogastra
 Olpogastra lugubris, bottletail (slender bottletail)
 Orthetrum
 Orthetrum abbotti, little skimmer (Abbott's skimmer)
 Orthetrum brachiale, banded skimmer
 Orthetrum caffrum, two-striped skimmer
 Orthetrum chrysostigma, epaulet skimmer
 Orthetrum guineense, Guinea skimmer
 Orthetrum hintzi, dark-shouldered skimmer (Hintz's skimmer)
 Orthetrum icteromelas, spectacled skimmer
 Orthetrum julia, Julia skimmer
 Orthetrum machadoi, highland skimmer (Machado's skimmer)
 Orthetrum monardi, woodland skimmer
 Orthetrum robustum, robust skimmer
 Orthetrum rubens, elusive skimmer (ruby skimmer)
 Orthetrum stemmale, bold skimmer (strong skimmer)
 Orthetrum trinacria, long skimmer
 Palpopleura
 Palpopleura deceptor, deceptive widow
 Palpopleura jucunda, yellow-veined widow
 Palpopleura lucia, Lucia widow
 Palpopleura portia, portia widow
 Pantala
 Pantala flavescens, pantala (wandering glider)
 Parazyxomma
 Parazyxomma flavicans, banded duskdarter (banded dusk-darter)
 Rhyothemis
 Rhyothemis semihyalina, phantom flutterer
 Sympetrum
 Sympetrum fonscolombii, nomad
 Tetrathemis
 Tetrathemis polleni, black-splashed elf (black-splash)
 Tholymis
 Tholymis tillarga, twister
 Tramea
 Tramea basilaris, keyhole glider
 Tramea limbata, ferruginous glider (voyaging glider)

 Trithemis
 Trithemis aconita, halfshade dropwing (monkshood dropwing)
 Trithemis annulata, violet dropwing
 Trithemis arteriosa, red-veined dropwing
 Trithemis donaldsoni, denim dropwing (Donaldson’s dropwing)
 Trithemis dorsalis, highland dropwing (dorsal dropwing, round-hook dropwing)
 Trithemis furva, navy dropwing
 Trithemis hecate, silhouette dropwing (Hecate dropwing)
 Trithemis kirbyi, orange-winged dropwing (Kirby’s dropwing)
 Trithemis pluvialis, russet dropwing (river dropwing, riffle-and-reed dropwing)
 Trithemis stictica, jaunty dropwing
 Trithemis werneri, elegant dropwing (Werner’s dropwing)
 Urothemis
 Urothemis assignata, red basker
 Urothemis edwardsii, blue basker
 Urothemis luciana, St Lucia basker
 Zygonoides
 Zygonoides fuelleborni, southern riverking (Fulleborn’s riverking, robust riverking)
 Zygonyx
 Zygonyx natalensis, blue cascader (Scuffed Cascader)
 Zygonyx torridus, ringed cascader
 Zyxomma
 Zyxomma atlanticum, smoky duskdarter (smoky dusk-darter)

References

External links
 African Dragonflies and Damselflies Online
 Warwick Tarboton's photographs of Dragonflies and Damselflies of South Africa
 JP Labuschagne's site: Dragonflies and Damselflies of southern Africa
 A Visual Guide to the Damselflies and Dragonflies of South Africa

 South Africa
Odonata
South Africa